Siukh is a rural locality (a selo) in Khasavyurtovsky District, Republic of Dagestan, Russia. The population was 3,313 as of 2010. There are 27 streets.

Geography 
Siukh is located 23 km north of Khasavyurt (the district's administrative centre) by road. Tsiyab Ichichali is the nearest rural locality.

References 

Rural localities in Khasavyurtovsky District